David Walter may refer to:

David Walter (17th century), Groom of the Bedchamber from 1661 and Lieutenant-General of the Ordnance from 1670 till 1679
David Walter (politician) (born 1939), New Zealand politician and journalist
David Walter (journalist) (1948–2012),  British journalist
Dave Walter (ice hockey) (born 1952), Canadian ice hockey player
David Walter (oboist) (born 1958), French oboist, conductor and music professor
Dave Walter (born 1964), American football quarterback

See also
David Walters (born 1951), United States Democratic Party politician and former governor for the state of Oklahoma